At least 30 tropical cyclones have affected the Southern African mainland. Three southeastern African countries border the Indian Ocean – Tanzania, Mozambique, and South Africa. Other inland countries also experience the effects of tropical cyclones, including Botswana, Eswatini, Lesotho, Malawi, Namibia, Zambia, and Zimbabwe.

Storms

1800s
April 1872 - A cyclone affected Zanzibar and Bagamoyo in current-day Tanzania.

1900s
February 15, 1950 - After crossing Madagascar, a cyclone struck eastern Mozambique and moved across much of Africa, eventually reaching northern Namibia.
The cyclone left 34 fatalities in Tanzania.
January 28, 1984 - Tropical Storm Domoina struck southeastern Mozambique, and later crossed into Swaziland and eastern South Africa. In Mozambique, Domoina killed 109 people and caused about $75 million in damage. Rainfall in Swaziland reached  at Piggs Peak. Damage in the country totaled $54 million, with 73 deaths. In South Africa, rainfall peaked at 950 mm (37 in, causing 100 year floods along the Umfolozi River. The Pongola River altered its course after the storm. Flooding caused the Pongolapoort Dam to reach 87% of its capacity; when waters were released to maintain the structural integrity, additional flooding occurred in Mozambique, forcing thousands to evacuate. Across South Africa, the storm caused 60 deaths and damaged the properties of 500,000 people, causing R100 million (1984 ZAR, $70 million 1984 USD).
February 19, 1984 - Tropical Storm Imboa looped off the east coast of South Africa, causing flooding and killing four people in the country.

2000s

January 3, 2000 - A tropical depression, previously Tropical Storm Astride, struck northeastern Mozambique and produced rainfall as far inland as Malawi. 
February 22, 2000 - Cyclone Eline moved ashore near Beira, Mozambique. Exasperating previous floods, the cyclone produced the country's worst natural disaster in a century. The combined effects of the preceding floods and Eline left about 300,000 people homeless, about 700 deaths, and damage estimated at $500 million (2000 USD). The cyclone and the floods disrupted much of the economic progress Mozambique had made in the 1990s since the end of its civil war. Eline also killed 21 people in South Africa, where damage reached at least US$300 million. In Zimbabwe, Eline washed away transportation infrastructure and killed 12 people. Heavy rainfall occurred as far inland as Namibia.
March 8, 2000 - Rains from former Tropical Storm Gloria disrupted aid distribution in Mozambique following Eline's deadly landfall two weeks prior.
April 2, 2000 - Cyclone Hudah made landfall in northeastern Mozambique near Antalaha, marking the first time on record that two storms of tropical cyclone intensity struck the country. Hudah killed three people and damaged hundreds of homes.
April 11, 2000 - A subtropical depression approached the Mozambique coast near Inhambane, dropping  of rainfall over 48 hours.
March 8, 2001 - A tropical depression brushed the east coast of Mozambique and later intensified into Tropical Cyclone Dera in the Mozambique Channel. Flooding from the storm destroyed a few homes and killed two people.
December 30, 2001 - The precursor to Tropical Storm Cyprien developed over eastern Mozambique, bringing rainfall, and later becoming a tropical storm in the Mozambique Channel.
November 12, 2002 - Tropical Depression Atang moved ashore near the border of Mozambique and Tanzania, bringing rainfall.
December 31, 2002 - Tropical Storm Delfina struck eastern Mozambique, and over the next few days drifted over land until re-emerging into the Mozambique Channel on January 6, 2003. The storm dropped heavy rainfall, reaching  in Nampula. The rains caused flooding that damaged or destroyed more than 20,000 houses. Delfina killed 47 people in Mozambique and eight in neighboring Malawi.
March 2, 2003 - Cyclone Japhet struck Mozambique near Vilankulo, where wind gusts reached . Across the country, Japhet damaged or destroyed 25,000 houses, killing 17 people. There was another eight deaths in neighboring Zambia.
January 26, 2004 - Cyclone Elita
October 29, 2004 - Tropical disturbance
November 30, 2006 - Tropical Storm Anita
February 22, 2007 - After passing south of Madagascar, Cyclone Favio struck southern Mozambique
December 29, 2007 - Tropical Storm Elnus
March 8, 2008 - Cyclone Jokwe
October 24, 2008 - The remnants of Tropical Storm Asma
March 27, 2009 - Tropical Storm Izilda

2010s

January 17, 2012 - Subtropical Depression Dando struck southern Mozambique, bringing heavy rainfall across the region. The storm killed four people in Mozambique and another six in South Africa. Damage in South Africa was around $65 million.
January 21, 2012 - Cyclone Funso looped off the east coast of Mozambique. Heavy rains related to the storm killed 21 people in the country. Rains also extended into Malawi.
March 6, 2012 - Tropical Storm Irina looped off southeastern Africa, causing 12 deaths between Mozambique and South Africa.
February 16, 2013 - The precursor to Cyclone Haruna moved across northeastern Mozambique.
January 20, 2014 - Former Tropical Storm Deliwe struck eastern Mozambique.
January 31, 2014 - A tropical disturbance moved ashore eastern Mozambique.
February 17, 2014 - The precursor to Tropical Storm Guito developed over northeastern Mozambique.
March 26, 2014 - Heavy rainfall from developing Cyclone Hellen over northeastern Mozambique killed four people. The remnants of the storm later struck south-central Mozambique.
January 14, 2015 - The precursor to Tropical Storm Chedza produced flooding rains across southeastern Africa.
April 27, 2016 - The remnants of Cyclone Fantala produced flooding in Tanzania that killed 13 people and washed away 315 houses. Rainfall from the storm spread northward into Kenya, causing flooding.
February 15, 2017 - Cyclone Dineo struck central Mozambique, causing flooding that extended into Zimbabwe and Malawi. It killed 7 people in Mozambique and 251 people in Zimbabwe.
January 15, 2018 - Tropical Depression 4 struck northeastern Mozambique and meandered over the country. Heavy rainfall killed 11 people.
January 17, 2019 - A tropical low formed over Mozambique and later intensified into Tropical Storm Desmond in the Mozambique Channel, which struck southern Mozambique a few days later. It dropped heavy rainfall along its path.
March 4, 2019 - A tropical depression moved ashore Mozambique, and later moved into the Mozambique Channel, strengthening into Cyclone Idai. The intense tropical cyclone made landfall near Beira and weakened as it moved into Zimbabwe. The cyclone killed 1,302 people across Mozambique, Zimbabwe, and Malawi, making it the second-deadliest tropical cyclone on record in the Southern Hemisphere, only behind the 1973 Flores cyclone in Indonesia. Idai caused widespread and disruptive flooding, with monetary damage estimated at US$2.2 billion. The storm also led to a cholera outbreak across the region.
April 25, 2019 - Cyclone Kenneth became the strongest tropical cyclone on record to strike Mozambique, when it moved ashore just north of Pemba. The JTWC estimated landfall winds of 220 km/h (140 mph). Kenneth killed 45 people in Mozambique, less than two months after Idai's deadly trek through the region.

2020s

December 30, 2020 - Tropical Storm Chalane struck Mozambique and moved across southern Africa, emerging into the South Atlantic Ocean on January 3. Heavy rainfall occurred as far west as Namibia.
January 22, 2021 - Cyclone Eloise made landfall just north of Beira, Mozambique, and continued southwestward, eventually dissipating over South Africa. The storm killed 11 in Mozambique, 10 in South Africa, 3 in Zimbabwe, and 2 in eSwatini.
February 12, 2021 - The precursor to Cyclone Guambe moved ashore southern Mozambique, and later moved back through the country and redeveloped in the Mozambique Channel. The storm brought heavy rainfall to the region.
April 24, 2021 - Tropical Storm Jobo dissipated just off the east coast of Tanzania. Its remnants brought rainfall and strong winds that killed 22 people in the country.
January 24, 2022 - Tropical Storm Ana struck northern Mozambique, killing 20 people in the country and 37 in Malawi.
February 18, 2022 - Tropical Storm Dumako dissipated near the east coast of Mozambique, bringing heavy rainfall.
March 11, 2022 - Cyclone Gombe struck Nampula Province in Mozambique as an intense tropical cyclone. It killed 63 people in the country, and another 7 in neighboring Malawi.
April 12, 2022 - Subtropical Depression Issa formed near the southeast coast of South Africa.

Climatological statistics

Notes

References

Southern Africa
Southern Africa